M55 or M-55 may refer to:

Military
 M55 rocket, a nerve agent-filled American Cold War-era rocket
 Myasishchev M-55, a Soviet reconnaissance aircraft
 M55 self propelled howitzer, an American self-propelled artillery piece
 M55 machine gun trailer mount, an American quadruple .50 caliber machine gun system based on the M45 Quadmount
 Zastava M55, a Yugoslav/Serbian anti-aircraft gun
 Tikka M55, a Finnish rifle
 M55 folding stock version of the Reising submachine gun

Transportation

Roads 
 M55 motorway, a road in Lancashire, United Kingdom, connecting Blackpool and the M6 at Preston
 M55 highway (Russia), a 1113 km road connecting Irkutsk and Chita
 M-55 (Michigan highway), a road in Michigan connecting Lake Huron and Lake Michigan
 M55 (Cape Town), a Metropolitan Route in Cape Town, South Africa

Other transportation
 M55 (New York City bus), a New York City Bus route in Manhattan

Other uses
 Messier 55 (M55), a globular cluster in the constellation Sagittarius
 M55, a Samsung Sens laptop computer model
 M 55, an age group for Masters athletics (athletes aged 35+)

See also

 MLV (disambiguation)